Hertford Regional College (HRC) is a further education college located over two sites in Hertfordshire, England.

History
Hertford Regional College (HRC) was formed from the merger of Ware College and East Herts College in 1991. Today, the College is based at two sites in Hertfordshire at Turnford and at Ware.

About the College
HRC offers a range of full-time study programmes, apprenticeships, higher education qualifications and part-time courses. Courses are designed to prepare students for progression to their chosen career - whether that be directly from the college or after further/higher education.

Subjects taught include Art and Design, Business, Catering, Hairdressing, Performing Arts, Sports, Teacher Training and more. There is a dedicated building at the Ware Campus at which specialist programmes are delivered for students with learning difficulties and disabilities.

A proportion of HRC's Higher Education qualifications are validated by universities, including the University of Hertfordshire and the University of Greenwich.
 
In 2015, HRC partnered with Tottenham Hotspur Football Club to create a Football Development Centre, combining academic and sporting qualifications. This partnership offers students the opportunity to train at Tottenham Hotspur's official training ground and be taught by experienced coaches.

Campuses and Facilities
The college has two campuses, one located in Broxbourne and one in Ware.

Ware
The Ware campus is home to the Creative Arts and Enterprise building. The campus offers training in subjects including Fine Art, Photography, Visual Merchandising, Graphic and 3D Design, Games Design and Hair, Beauty and Media Make-Up.

Inspires Salon
The college's Inspires Salon features five hairdressing salons and six beauty salons. It is open to the public.

Broxbourne
The Broxbourne campus houses all of the college's STEM facilities, including Engineering, Motor Vehicle, Construction and Electrical workshops, as well as Science laboratories. Also on this campus are the Michael Morpurgo Theatre, TV and recording studios, Childcare and Health & Social Care suites, gym and sports hall and a JetBlue air cabin – an 18-seat aircraft cabin which has been lifted straight from a real British Airways plane.

Atrium Restaurant
The Atrium Restaurant is a student-run restaurant, open to the public, found on the Broxbourne campus. It serves modern European cuisine and is rated the #1 restaurant in Broxbourne on TripAdvisor.

Alumni
 Maggie Alphonsi, international rugby player
 George Ezra, musician
 Marcus Graham, artist

References

Further education colleges in Hertfordshire
Buildings and structures in Hertford
Educational institutions established in 1991
1991 establishments in England